Agribusiness is the industry, enterprises, and the field of study of value chains in agriculture and in the bio-economy,
in which case it is also called bio-business or bio-enterprise. 
The primary goal of agribusiness is to maximize profit while satisfying the needs of consumers for products related to natural resources such as biotechnology, farms, food, forestry, fisheries, fuel, and fiber.

Studies of business growth and performance in farming have found successful agricultural businesses are cost-efficient internally and operate in favorable economic, political, and physical-organic environments.  They are able to expand and make profits, improve the productivity of land, labor, and capital, and keep their costs down to ensure market price competitiveness.

Agribusiness is not limited to farming. It encompasses a broader spectrum through the agribusiness system which includes input supplies, value-addition, marketing, entrepreneurship, microfinancing, and agricultural extension.

In some countries like the Philippines, creation and management of agribusiness enterprises require consultation with registered agriculturists above a certain level of operations, capitalization, land area, or number of animals in the farm.

Evolution of the agribusiness concept
The word "agribusiness" is a portmanteau of the words agriculture and business. The earliest known use of the word was in the Volume 155 of the Canadian Almanac & Directory published in 1847. Although most practitioners recognize that it was coined in 1957 by two Harvard Business School professors, John Davis and Ray Goldberg after they published the book "A Concept of Agribusiness."

"Agribusiness is the sum total of all operations involved in the manufacture and distribution of farm supplies; production operations on the farm; and the storage, processing, and distribution of farm commodities and items made from them." (Davis and Goldberg, 1956)

Their book argued against the New Deal programs of then U.S. President Franklin Roosevelt as it led to the increase in agricultural prices. Davis and Goldberg favored corporate-driven agriculture or large-scale farming to revolutionize the agriculture sector, lessening the dependency on state power and politics. They explained in the book that vertically integrated firms within the agricultural value chains have the ability to control prices and where they are distributed. Goldberg then assisted in the establishment of the first undergraduate program in agribusiness in 1966 at the UP College of Agriculture in Los Baños, Philippines as Bachelor of Science in Agriculture major in Agribusiness. The program was initially a joint undertaking with the UP College of Business Administration in Diliman, Quezon City until 1975. Dr. Jose D. Drilon of the University of the Philippines then published the book "Agribusiness Management Resource Materials" (1971) which would be the foundation of current agribusiness programs around the world. In 1973, Drilon and Goldberg further expanded the concept of agribusiness to include support organizations such as governments, research institutions, schools, financial institutions, and cooperatives within the integrated Agribusiness System.

Mark R. Edwards and Clifford J. Shultz II (2005) of Loyola University Chicago reframed the definition of agribusiness to emphasize its lack of focus on farm production but towards market centricity and innovative approach to serve consumers worldwide.
"Agribusiness is a dynamic and systemic endeavor that serves consumers globally and locally through innovation and management of multiple value chains that deliver valued goods and services derived from sustainable orchestration of food, fiber and natural resources." (Edwards and Shultz, 2005)In 2012, Thomas L. Sporleder and Michael A. Boland defined the unique economic characteristics of agribusiness supply chains from industrial manufacturing and service supply chains. They have identified seven main characteristics:

 Risks emanating from the biological nature of agrifood supply chains
 The role of buffer stocks within the supply chain
 The scientific foundation of innovation in production agriculture having shifted from chemistry to biology
 Cyberspace and information technology influences on agrifood supply chains
 The prevalent market structure at the farm gate remains oligopsony
 Relative market power shifts in agrifood supply chains away from food manufacturers downstream to food retailers
 Globalization of agriculture and agrifood supply chains

In 2017, noting the rise of genetic engineering and biotechnology in agriculture, Goldberg further expanded the definition of agribusiness which covers all the interdependent aspects of the food system including medicine, nutrition, and health. He also emphasized the responsibility of agribusiness to be environmentally and socially conscious towards sustainability.

"Agribusiness is the interrelated and interdependent industries in agriculture that supply, process, distribute, and support the products of agriculture." (Goldberg, 2017)

Some agribusinesses have adopted the triple bottom line framework such as aligning for fair trade, organic, good agricultural practices, and B-corporation certifications towards the concept of social entrepreneurship.

Agribusiness System

Inputs Sector

Agricultural supplies 
An agricultural supply store or agrocenter is an agriculturally-oriented shop where one sells agricultural supplies — inputs required for agricultural production such as pesticides, feed and fertilizers . Sometimes these stores are organized as cooperatives, where store customers aggregate their resources to purchase agricultural inputs. Agricultural supply and the stores that provide it are part of the larger Agribusiness industry.

Agricultural labor

Irrigation

Seeds

Fertilizers

Production Sector

Farming

Farm Mechanization

Processing Sector

Primary Processing

Secondary Processing

Marketing Sector

Farmers' Market

Support Sector

Education

Cooperatives

Governments

Professionals

Studies and Reports 
Studies of agribusiness often come from the academic fields of agricultural economics and management studies, sometimes called agribusiness management. To promote more development of food economies, many government agencies support the research and publication of economic studies and reports exploring agribusiness and agribusiness practices. Some of these studies are on foods produced for export and are derived from agencies focused on food exports. These agencies include the Foreign Agricultural Service (FAS) of the U.S. Department of Agriculture, Agriculture and Agri-Food Canada (AAFC), Austrade, and New Zealand Trade and Enterprise (NZTE).

The Federation of International Trade Associations publishes studies and reports by FAS and AAFC, as well as other non-governmental organizations on its website.

In their book A Concept of Agribusiness, Ray Goldberg and John Davis provided a rigorous economic framework for the field. They traced a complex value-added chain that begins with the farmer's purchase of seed and livestock and ends with a product fit for the consumer's table. Agribusiness boundary expansion is driven by a variety of transaction costs.

As concern over global warming intensifies, biofuels derived from crops are gaining increased public and scientific attention. This is driven by factors such as oil price spikes, the need for increased energy security, concern over greenhouse gas emissions from fossil fuels, and support from government subsidies. In Europe and in the US, increased research and production of biofuels have been mandated by law.

See also 

 Agrarian law
 Agrarian reform
 Agribusiness in Kenya
 Agricultural machinery industry
 Agricultural marketing
 Agricultural value chain
 Agroecology
 Animal–industrial complex
 Biofuel
 Contract farming
 Energy crop
 Energy law
 Environmental impact of agriculture
 Factory farming
 Industrial agriculture
 Land banking
 Pharming (genetics)

References

Citations

Cited sources

Further reading

Gitta, Cosmas and South, David (2012). Southern Innovator Magazine Issue 3: Agribusiness and Food Security: United Nations Office for South-South Cooperation. ISSN 2222-9280
https://web.archive.org/web/20160304034828/http://www.ifama.org/files/IS_Ledesma_Formatted.pdf

Agricultural economics
Business
Agriculture